Pontevedra is a city in Galicia, Spain.

Pontevedra may also refer to:

Places

Spain
Province of Pontevedra, Galicia
Pontevedra (comarca)
Pontevedra (Parliament of Galicia constituency)
Pontevedra (Senate constituency)
Pontevedra (Congress of Deputies constituency)

Other countries
Pontevedra, Buenos Aires, Argentina
Pontevedra, Capiz, Philippines
Pontevedra, Negros Occidental, Philippines
Ponte Vedra Beach, Florida, U.S.

Sports
Pontevedra CF, a Spanish football team

See also